Ahmad Fauzi Saari (born 30 April 1982), is a Malaysian professional football player who last plays as a central midfielder for Malaysia Super League side Perlis FA.

Early life
Ahmad Fauzi Saari grew up in Ladang Anak Kulim, where his father was a supervisor and her mother used to ease their financial burden by tapping rubber there. He started playing football since he was a schoolboy, often with his multi-racial friends at the estate. In age of 16, his non-stop running style and talent in football was then discovered by teachers at Sekolah Menengah Kebangsaan Serdang (a secondary school in Serdang, Kedah).

Club career

Early career
There was no stopping Fauzi, or known as Pak Long among his Kedah FA teammates and fans. In 2002, he was selected for the Sukma Games to represent the Kedah state.

Kedah FA
His game is valued highly by the Kedah FA management who have placed their trust on him to stoke the engine room starting from 2004 season. He has been playing an important role in Kedah's good run in season 2006/07 and has scored some important goals for the club, mainly from long range. And sometimes, Fauzi was given the captain's armband whilst Victor Andrag and Cornelius Huggins were out from the team. He also a part of the squad that won historical double treble titles.

National team
In 2004, his ability to cover acres of space, no doubt due to his running around during his estate days, was discovered by Allan Harris. The Englishman, who helmed the Malaysia national football team from 2000 to 2004, quickly roped him in as an all-action man for the pre-Olympic campaign. Fauzi played in one match – in the 4–1 defeat to Iran on 3 March 2004. It was an unforgettable moment for the slightly-built player, because he remembered being outplayed by the physically superior Iranians. That remains to this day Fauzi's only appearance in the national jersey. That has not dampened his spirits. He recalled his first cap for Malaysia during an interview in 2006: 

During the 2007 AFC Asian Cup campaign, Fauzi was called by head coach Norizan Bakar to represent the country. Although he was part of the squad that thrash by China, Uzbekistan and Iran, he was not selected to play any single match on the tournament.

Honours

Kedah
 Malaysia Super League: 2006/07, 2007/08
 Runner-up: 2003
 Malaysia Premier League: 2002, 2005/06
 Runner-up: 2005
 Malaysia FA Cup: 2006/07, 2007/08
 Malaysia Cup: 2006/07, 2007/08
 Runner-up: 2004

References

1982 births
Living people
Malaysian footballers
Malaysia international footballers
2007 AFC Asian Cup players
Kedah Darul Aman F.C. players
Johor Darul Ta'zim F.C. players
Felda United F.C. players
ATM FA players
Perlis FA players
Negeri Sembilan FA players
Malaysia Super League players
Association football midfielders
People from Kedah
Malaysian people of Malay descent